"You Sound Like Louis Burdett" is a song by Australian band The Whitlams. It was released in January 1997 as the lead single from their third studio album, Eternal Nightcap. The single was placed at number 53 of Triple J's Hottest 100 of that year.

Louis Burdett is an eccentric inner-west Sydney personality. Tim Freedman once shared a cottage in Tempe with Burdett, who is described on the Whitlams' official site as "an underemployed avant-garde musician." The song's narrator repeatedly scolds himself for sounding like Louis Burdett.

Reception
The Guardian said, "Named for the drummer and Freedman’s one-time housemate, this energetic song is filled with sleazy guitar, jangling piano and a breathless account of life in Sydney that is bewildering to Whitlams fans living anywhere else."

Track listing
"You Sound Like Louis Burdett" – 4:00
"10 or 11 Drink Clown" – 3:49
"Charlie No.3" – 4:29
"Hurt" – 3:17

References

The Whitlams songs
1997 singles
Songs written by Tim Freedman
1996 songs